Carnarvon United Football Club was a football team from Caernarfon, Gwynedd. The club was formed in 1906 after a merger by Caernarvon Celts and Caernarvon RWF (Royal Welsh Fusiliers). In 1909 the club won both the Welsh and North Wales Amateur Cups. The club also played in the Welsh Cup. After World War I, the demobilised United players formed a new club (Caernarvon Athletic), a precursor of the current club Caernarfon Town.

Colours

Seasons

Cup History

Honours

League
North Wales Coast League Division 1
Winners : 1912
Runners-up : 1909, 1910, 1911, 1913

Cup
Welsh Amateur Cup
Winners : 1909

North Wales Amateur Cup
Winners : 1909, 1911

References

Football clubs in Wales
Sport in Gwynedd
Caernarfon
Defunct football clubs in Wales